The Worst of APO Hiking Society is the second live album by the Filipino musical trio APO Hiking Society. It was recorded on 30 November 1985 at a concert titled EtonAPOsila, held at the ULTRA.

Track listing
Ligawan Medley (4:41)
Yesterday Do-Re-Mi (Medley) (4:13)
1-2-3 (3:23)
Group And Its Music (9:11)
Friends In Music (3:17)
Salawikain (Classical Version) (5:20)
American Junk (Concert Version) (9:21)
Mr. T (For Tagalog) (Medley) (5:56)

References

APO Hiking Society albums
1985 live albums